St Stithians College (colloquially known as Saints) is a private Methodist school situated in the suburb of Lyme Park in the border of Sandton and Randburg in the city of Johannesburg in Gauteng province of South Africa. Founded in 1953 by Albert Collins, William Mountstephens and Gilbert Tucker, it has consistently ranked amongst the top performing independent schools in South Africa. It follows a co-ordinate educational model within a village of schools consisting of boys' and girls' colleges, boys' and girls' preparatory schools, and a junior preparatory. It is built on a 100 hectare estate, one of the largest school campuses in the country.

The College is organized into six schools on its main campus in Johannesburg and maintains facilities at the Kamoka Bush School near Modimolle and the virtual St Stithians Online School. As a Methodist school, it has ties to Kearsney College, Epworth High School, Penryn College and Kingswood College.

The Boys' and the Girls' Colleges are members of the Round Square Conference of Schools and G30 Schools Conference.

St Stithians College is also the host of the annual Saints Sports Festival which is the largest and longest continuous school sports festival in the world. The 2017 edition witnessed over 1,400 participants in 8 fields of sport, 200 fixtures and over 50,000 spectators.

History

The Boys' College

The idea of setting up a Methodist school in Johannesburg came to Gilbert Tucker, who wanted to base it on the pattern of his old school, Kingswood College in Grahamstown. The Methodist accountant did not have the money so he turned to people who would be interested in financing it.

He met two Cornishmen, both born in 1859, Albert Collins and William Mountstephens, who were Methodists and promising new businessmen who had started to make a name for themselves in their new country.

Collins, who never married, died first and this led to the creation of the Trust for building the Methodist school Tucker had dreamt of. The Trust was formally opened in April 1941 and, at Mountstephens' suggestion, was named after Collins' birthplace, Stithians, a village in Cornwall.

These trustees were D.F. Corlett, C.H. Leake, J.B. Webb and G.K. Tucker.

The Trust was able to purchase a piece of land, which was part of the farm Driefontein (one of the "fonteins" can be found on the grounds) for an amount of £8713 in 1943 but nothing further was achieved until after the War. At first it was thought that building costs might drop and so the trustees waited until it became obvious that prices would not drop and so the decision to build was made in 1951.

Mountstephens lived to see the land purchased, but not the school built; his widow on the other hand, was to take an active interest in the school until her death. The school was to have been a secondary school only and at first, the debate on co-education was open. Circumstances were to make decisions for the Trustees: the area was new and remote; its people wanted a boys' school and a preparatory school as well as a secondary school.

The first classes began on 28 January 1953, with Grades 1 and 2, and 8 and 9. On 3 February 1953 there was a formal opening ceremony. W.G.A. (Wally) Mears, formerly of Rondebosch Boys' High School, was the first headmaster, and taught English, Latin, History and Geography to the high school classes, with Mr E.M. Harris teaching Maths, Science and Scripture, and Mr Minnaar teaching Afrikaans. In the second year (1954) classes in the school ran from Grade 1 to Grade 10, and in 1956 the first group wrote the matriculation examination. As the school grew, Wally Mears, the headmaster, did less teaching, and became more an administrator. The school's hall is named for him.

The Girls College

St Stithians Girls College was opened in 1995 to form the coordinate module with the Boys College. The founding headmistress was Mrs Anne Van Zyl. The initial opening classes were grade 0 - 3 which was to expand rapidly to include all the grades up to and including grade 11 with the first grade 12 class being inducted in 1997. The Girls College was originally named the St Stithians Girls Collegiate, which would subsequently be changed when expanded. During 1994 the first classes would be held on the boys 'side of the rugby field' using already available infrastructure. As a part of the co-ordination module girls and boys school often have mixed classes in Drama, English, isiZulu, Afrikaans, Art and Computer Science. In 1996 the Collegiate would move across the field to newly developed complete school. The College facilities was further developed to include a large library, several computer rooms, a 'tuck shop' and gymnasium as well as a lecture theatre - used for assemblies and individual class plays. The first Matriculents of the college would sit their exams 1997.

In 1999 the founding houses of the Girls College were chosen. They were all named after towns within Cornwall, linking the college to its fore bearers. The girls were then to pick a name out of a hat to randomly divide the grades into the four houses. The names of the houses are Cambourne, Kenwyn, Stratton and Trewen respectively. These individual houses compete in various cultural and sporting house competitions as well as part take in different philanthropic endeavours. The uniform has changed over the years, with initially the girls wearing white floral dresses - which the girls prep still use as a summer uniform - to a Blue and red checked skirt and white blouse. The first top was a white golf shirt but this was changed to a white blouse in 2008.

The Badge
The Badge is based on the coat of arms of the Duke of Cornwall, which is a Crusader shield on which are displayed 15 golden Bezants in the shape of a triangle with the motto 'One and All'. The story of the 15 bezants occurs during the Crusades when the Duke of Cornwall was captured by the Saracens. A ransom of 15 bezants was set up. All the people of Cornwall contributed to raise the money for the ransom. It was paid and the Duke was set free. The inhabitants had all helped together One and All to raise the money – hence the motto.

The founders decided that the shield would have to be modified to suit the school, as a new badge. It was then decided that it should have a dark blue border along the outside edge of the shield with 15 gold bezants arranged equally along either side on the blue border. On the inside would be a silver shield on which the red cross stands out boldly to signify the Christian foundation of the college.

House system
St Stithians College has a house system. Each house competes against each other in Interhouse events to win the Harris Cup (Boys' College) at the end of the year. St Stithian's Boys' College has 10 houses, St Stithians Girls' College has 4.

Boys' Houses

Collins (Navy Blue) Boarding House
Henning (Maroon)
Krige (Purple)
Mears (Green)
Mountstephens (Red) Boarding House
Penryn (White)
Pitts (Grey)
Tucker (Yellow)
Webb (Light Blue)
Wesley (Orange)

Girls' Houses
Cambourne (Yellow)
Kenwyn (Green)
Stratton (Red)
Trewen (Blue)

Academics
The colleges write the Independent Examinations Board exams.

Sports

St Stithians Boys' College 

The sports that are played at the school are:
 Athletics
 Basketball
 Canoeing
 Chess 
 Cricket
 Cross country
 Cycling
 Golf
 Hockey
 Mountain biking 
 Rowing
 Rugby 
 Rugby sevens 
 Soccer 
 Squash
 Swimming
 Table tennis 
 Tennis
 Volleyball 
 Water polo

St Stithians Girls' College 

The sports that are played at the school are:
 Athletics
 Basketball
 Chess  
 Cross country
 Cycling
 Equestrian
 Hockey 
 Mountain biking 
 Netball
 Rowing
 Soccer 
 Squash
 Swimming
 Table tennis
 Tennis
 Volleyball 
 Water polo

Notable alumni from Boys' & Girls' College

Cricket 
 Roy Pienaar (Class of 1978), South African professional cricketer
 David Rundle (Class of 1983), South African cricketer
 David Terbrugge (Class of 1994) South African cricketer
 Grant Elliott (Class of 1997), New Zealand Cricketer
 Michael Lumb (Class of 1998) England cricketer
 Enoch Nkwe (Class of 2001) South African first-class cricketer
 Yassar Cook (Class of 2011) South African first-class cricketer. 
 Kagiso Rabada (Class of 2013), South African cricketer
 Ryan Rickelton (Class of 2014) South African first-class cricketer. 
 Marques Ackerman (Class of 2014), South African first-class cricketer
 Ricardo Vasconcelos, (Class of 2015) South African first-class cricketer
 Brandon Glover (Class of 2015) Dutch professional cricketer
 Wiaan Mulder (Class of 2016) South African professional cricketer
 Curtis Campher, (Class of 2017) South Africa U19; Irish international cricketer
 Harry Tector, (Class of 2017) Irish professional cricketer

Golf 
 Haydn Porteous (Class of 2010) South African professional golfer

Rugby 
 Lance Sherrell, (Class of 1984) Springbok rugby player
 Brent Russell, (Class of 1996) Springbok Rugby player 
 Dave Wessels, (Class of 2000) South African-Australian Head Coach
 Jono Ross, (Class of 2008) Blue Bulls/Sale Sharks rugby player. 
 Innocent Radebe, (Class of 2013), South African rugby player. 
 Asenathi Ntlabakanye, (Class of 2017) Lions & South Africa U20 rugby player. 
 TJ Maguranyanga (Class of 2020), ASM Clermont Auvergne player.

Powerlifting and Athletics 

 Gordon Shaw (Class of 2011) Olympic power lifter
 Andrea Dalle Ave (Class of 2011), para-Olympic sprinter and long jump athlete

Rowing 

 Anthea Dickson (Class of 2007) Junior SA rower 
 Kimberley Rheeder (Class of 2008) SA Rowing
 Kate Keeling (Class of 2008) SA Rowing
 Holly Norton (Class of 2011) British rower

Swimming   
 Jean Basson (Class of 2005) South African professional swimmer

Tennis  
 Kevin Anderson (Class of 2004) South African professional tennis player

Water polo 
 Lwazi Madi (Class of 2013) South African professional water polo
 Shakira January (Class of 2020) South African professional water polo
 Jordan Wedderburn (Class of 2020) South African professional water polo

Other Sports 
 Connor Beauchamp (Class of 2015) South African field hockey
 Paige Lindenberg (Class of 2010) South African Racing Driver  
 Sarah Hill (cyclist) (Class of 2011) SA Mountain Bicycle Rider
 Micaela Bouter (Class of 2013) South African professional Diver
 Hayley Lanham Parker - Olympic Equestrian Show jumper

Politics 
 Ian Shapiro (Class of 1968) Political Scientist
 Mark Blecher (Class of 1977), Chief Director at the National Treasury of SA
 James Lorimer M.P. (Class of 1979) shadow minister for the Democratic Alliance

Theatre, Films, Broadcasting and Acting 

 Jon Blair, writer, film producer and director
 Gavin Hood, (Class of 1981) filmmaker, screenwriter, producer, and actor

Music 

 Dave Matthews, (Class of 1983) lead singer of the Dave Matthews Band
 Tokollo Tshabalala, Kabelo Mabalane, (Class of 1995) and Zwai Bala, (Class of 1994) members of TKZee
 Kyle Watson (Class of 2006) South African DJ and record producer

Books about St Stithians 

 Wally Mears (Founding Head of St Stithians College) The Early History of St Stithians College
Pauline Dickson (Gardner at St Stithians for over 36 years) A Gardener's Legacy
 Water MacFarlane (Previous Boys' Prep Head and staff member from 1966-1983) To Serve the Future Hour

See also
 List of boarding schools

References

 School History
 Visual School History

Further reading
Mears, W. G. A., comp. (1972) The Early History of St Stithians College. Randburg: Council of St Stithians College

External links
 St Stithians College official site
 Old Stithian Association

Boarding schools in South Africa
Christianity in Johannesburg
Educational institutions established in 1953
Member schools of the Headmasters' and Headmistresses' Conference
Methodist schools in South Africa
Private schools in Gauteng
Schools in Johannesburg
Round Square schools
1953 establishments in South Africa
Alliance of Girls' Schools Australasia